Don Gowland (born 31 August 1940) is an Australian sports shooter. He competed in the men's 50 metre rifle, prone event at the 1976 Summer Olympics.

References

1940 births
Living people
Australian male sport shooters
Olympic shooters of Australia
Shooters at the 1976 Summer Olympics
Place of birth missing (living people)